Pelegrín Esteve (22 May 1901 – 2 June 1968) was a Spanish sports shooter. He competed in the 25 m pistol event at the 1948 Summer Olympics.

References

1901 births
1968 deaths
Spanish male sport shooters
Olympic shooters of Spain
Shooters at the 1948 Summer Olympics
Sportspeople from Barcelona